Embedded is a play starring, written, and directed by Tim Robbins. It chronicles the war in Iraq through satire and commedia dell'arte masks. It also pokes fun at neo-conservatives such as Karl Rove, Condoleezza Rice, Dick Cheney, and Donald Rumsfeld.

The Actors' Gang
Original Cast Los Angeles, New York and London:
Tim Robbins - Sarge and Cove
V.J. Foster - Hardchannel and Announcer
Brent Hinkley - Rum Rum and Chip Webb
Jay R. Martinez - Ramon and Camera Kid
Kate Mulligan - Maryanne, Woof and Gwen
Steven M. Porter - Jen's Dad, Dick and Buford T 
Lolly Ward - Jen's Mom, Amy Constant and Woof
Benjamin J. Cain Jr. - Monk
Kailie Hollister - Jen Jen Ryan
Riki Lindhome - Gondola and Journalist
Andrew Wheeler - Pearly White and Stringer
Mark Lewis (New York) Nathan Kornelis (London) - Lieutenant and Journalist

U.S.A Touring Cast:
P. Adam Walsh - Hardchannel and Cove
Matt Huffman - Rum Rum and Chip Webb
Simon Anthony - Stringer and Jay R. Martinez
Nancy Stone - Maryanne and Gwen
Corey Lovett- Buford T. and Woof
Anna Sommer - Amy Constant and Jen's Mom
Malcom Smith - Monk
Eric Greene - Pearly White and Jen's Dad
Vanessa Mizzone - Jen Jen and Gondola
Mark Lewis - Lieutenant and Cove

External links
Playbill News, January 16, 2004

2003 plays
Plays by Tim Robbins